Chionodes is a genus of moths of the family Gelechiidae. It is distributed throughout much of the world. The larvae of many species use the Douglas fir as a host plant.

Species
The formosella species-group
Chionodes formosella-complex
Chionodes abitus Hodges, 1999
Chionodes argentipunctella (Ely, 1910)
Chionodes bicostomaculella (Chambers, 1872)
Chionodes formosella (Murtfeldt, 1881)
Chionodes fuscomaculella (Chambers, 1872)
Chionodes hapsus Hodges, 1999
Chionodes iridescens Clarke, 1947
Chionodes percultor Hodges, 1999
Chionodes powelli Hodges, 1999
Chionodes suasor Hodges, 1999
Chionodes gilvomaculella-complex
Chionodes abavus Hodges, 1999
Chionodes cacula Hodges, 1999
Chionodes drapeta Hodges, 1999
Chionodes emptor Hodges, 1999
Chionodes esor Hodges, 1999
Chionodes gilvomaculella (Clemens, 1863)
Chionodes rabula Hodges, 1999
Chionodes franclemonti-complex
Chionodes franclemonti Hodges, 1999
Chionodes tarmes Hodges, 1999
Chionodes lophosella-complex
Chionodes lophosella (Busck, 1910)
Chionodes nanodella (Busck, 1910)
Chionodes abella-complex
Chionodes abella (Busck, 1903)
Chionodes davisi Hodges, 1999
Chionodes delitor Hodges, 1999
Chionodes donahueorum Hodges, 1999
Chionodes imber Hodges, 1999
Chionodes johnstoni Clarke, 1947
Chionodes lactans Hodges, 1999
Chionodes meddix Hodges, 1999
Chionodes munifex Hodges, 1999
Chionodes naevus Hodges, 1999
Chionodes nitor Hodges, 1999
Chionodes obex Hodges, 1999
Chionodes pacator Hodges, 1999
Chionodes pavor Hodges, 1999
Chionodes periculella (Busck, 1910)
Chionodes pulvis Hodges, 1999
Chionodes rector Hodges, 1999
Chionodes regens Hodges, 1999
Chionodes sabinianae Powell, 1959
Chionodes sanator Hodges, 1999
Chionodes sannio Hodges, 1999
Chionodes stator Hodges, 1999
Chionodes tessa Clarke, 1947
Chionodes volo Hodges, 1999
Chionodes sistrella-complex
Chionodes abdominella (Busck, 1903)
Chionodes cibus Hodges, 1999
Chionodes dentella (Busck, 1903)
Chionodes fructuarius (Braun, 1925)
Chionodes hodgesorum Metzler, 2014
Chionodes kincaidella (Busck, 1907)
Chionodes lacticoma (Meyrick, 1917)
Chionodes landryi Hodges, 1999
Chionodes macor Hodges, 1999
Chionodes nepos Hodges, 1999
Chionodes oecus Hodges, 1999
Chionodes paean Hodges, 1999
Chionodes pinguicula (Meyrick, 1929)
Chionodes plutor Hodges, 1999
Chionodes procus Hodges, 1999
Chionodes repertor Hodges, 1999
Chionodes sistrella (Busck, 1903)
Chionodes thyotes Hodges, 1999
Chionodes xanthophilella (Barnes & Busck, 1920)
Chionodes dammersi-complex
Chionodes bardus Hodges, 1999
Chionodes dammersi (Keifer, 1936)
Chionodes helicosticta (Meyrick, 1929)
Chionodes luteogeminatus (Clarke, 1935)
Chionodes morus Hodges, 1999
Chionodes notandella (Busck, 1916)
Chionodes ochreostrigella (Chambers, 1875)
Chionodes paralogella (Busck, 1916)
Chionodes rhombus Hodges, 1999
unplaced to complex
Chionodes icriodes (Meyrick, 1931)
Chionodes litigiosa (Meyrick, 1917)
Chionodes pentadora (Meyrick, 1917)
Chionodes pleroma (Walsingham, 1911)
Chionodes scotodes (Walsingham, 1911)
The obscurusella species-group
Chionodes thoraceochrella-complex
Chionodes chrysopyla (Keifer, 1935)
Chionodes salicella Sattler, 1967
Chionodes thoraceochrella (Chambers, 1872)
Chionodes hostis-complex
Chionodes hostis Hodges, 1999
Chionodes lector Hodges, 1999
Chionodes obscurusella-complex
Chionodes acerella Sattler, 1967
Chionodes metoecus Hodges, 1999
Chionodes obscurusella (Chambers, 1872)
Chionodes occidentella-complex
Chionodes dryobathra (Meyrick, 1917)
Chionodes fremor Hodges, 1999
Chionodes lusor Hodges, 1999
Chionodes mediofuscella (Clemens, 1863)
Chionodes occidentella (Chambers, 1875)
Chionodes soter Hodges, 1999
Chionodes terminimaculella-complex
Chionodes terminimaculella (Kearfott, 1908)
Chionodes erro-complex
Chionodes erro Hodges, 1999
Chionodes trichostola-complex
Chionodes parens Hodges, 1999
Chionodes trichostola (Meyrick, 1923)
Chionodes sevir Hodges, 1999
Chionodes acrina-complex
Chionodes acrina (Keifer, 1933)
Chionodes adam Hodges, 1999
Chionodes altor Hodges, 1999
Chionodes concinna-complex
Chionodes cautor Hodges, 1999
Chionodes concinna (Walsingham, 1911)
Chionodes irreptor-complex
Chionodes irreptor Hodges, 1999
Chionodes baro-complex
Chionodes baro Hodges, 1999
Chionodes secutor Hodges, 1999
Chionodes trophella-complex
Chionodes restio Hodges, 1999
Chionodes trophella (Busck, 1903)
Chionodes pinax-complex
Chionodes pinax Hodges, 1999
Chionodes adamas-complex
Chionodes adamas Hodges, 1999
Chionodes creberrima (Walsingham, 1911)
Chionodes ludio Hodges, 1999
Chionodes messor Hodges, 1999
Chionodes nubis Hodges, 1999
Chionodes optio Hodges, 1999
Chionodes pastor Hodges, 1999
Chionodes magirus-complex
Chionodes magirus Hodges, 1999
Chionodes innox-complex
Chionodes gestor Hodges, 1999
Chionodes innox Hodges, 1999
Chionodes fondella-complex
Chionodes fondella (Busck, 1906)
Chionodes pseudofondella (Busck, 1908)
Chionodes bibo-complex
Chionodes bibo Hodges, 1999
Chionodes pereyra-complex
Chionodes pereyra Clarke, 1947
Chionodes petalumensis Clarke, 1947
unplaced to complex
Chionodes bufo (Walsingham, 1911)
Chionodes cacoderma (Walsingham, 1911)
Chionodes neptica (Walsingham, 1911)
The phalacrus species-group
Chionodes argosema (Meyrick, 1917)
Chionodes consona (Meyrick, 1917)
Chionodes donatella (Walker, 1864)
Chionodes eburata (Meyrick, 1917)
Chionodes mariona (Heinrich, 1921)
Chionodes petro Hodges, 1999
Chionodes phalacra (Walsingham, 1911)
Chionodes popa Hodges, 1999
The discoocellella species-group
Chionodes discoocellella (Chambers, 1872)
Chionodes halycopa (Meyrick, 1927)
The ceryx species-group
Chionodes ceryx Hodges, 1999
The lugubrella species-group
Chionodes lugubrella-complex
Chionodes ceanothiella (Busck, 1904)
Chionodes kubai Hodges, 1999
Chionodes lugubrella (Fabricius, 1794)
Chionodes obelus Hodges, 1999
Chionodes hibiscella-complex
Chionodes aruns Hodges, 1999
Chionodes bios Hodges, 1999
Chionodes canofusella Clarke, 1947
Chionodes chlorocephala (Meyrick, 1932)
Chionodes hibiscella (Busck, 1903)
Chionodes salva (Meyrick, 1925)
Chionodes retiniella-complex
Chionodes elainae Hodges, 1999
Chionodes luror Hodges, 1999
Chionodes retiniella (Barnes & Busck, 1920)
Chionodes tragicella-complex
Chionodes arenella (Forbes, 1922)
Chionodes aristella (Busck, 1903)
Chionodes dolo Hodges, 1999
Chionodes factor Hodges, 1999
Chionodes figurella (Busck, 1912)
Chionodes grandis Clarke, 1947
Chionodes hospes Hodges, 1999
Chionodes pallor Hodges, 1999
Chionodes soella Huemer & Sattler, 1995
Chionodes tragicella (Heyden, 1865)
Chionodes luctuella-complex
Chionodes aprilella Huemer & Sattler, 1995
Chionodes luctuella (Hübner, 1793)
Chionodes rectifex Hodges, 1999
Chionodes holosericella-complex
Chionodes agriodes (Meyrick, 1927)
Chionodes aleo Hodges, 1999
Chionodes bicolor Clarke, 1947
Chionodes boreas Hodges, 1999
Chionodes caucasiella Huemer & Sattler, 1995
Chionodes cusor Hodges, 1999
Chionodes dator Hodges, 1999
Chionodes fimus Hodges, 1999
Chionodes flavipalpella Huemer & Sattler, 1995
Chionodes gratus Hodges, 1999
Chionodes holosericella (Herrich-Schäffer, 1854)
Chionodes mikkolai Hodges, 1999
Chionodes molitor Hodges, 1999
Chionodes mongolica Piskunov, 1979
Chionodes occlusa (Braun, 1925)
Chionodes praeclarella (Herrich-Schäffer, 1854)
Chionodes praeco Hodges, 1999
Chionodes psiloptera (Barnes & Busck, 1920)
Chionodes rogator Hodges, 1999
Chionodes rupex Hodges, 1999
Chionodes senica Hodges, 1999
Chionodes sponsus Hodges, 1999
Chionodes tannuolella (Rebel, 1917)
Chionodes trico Hodges, 1999
Chionodes ustor Hodges, 1999
Chionodes veles Hodges, 1999
Chionodes violacea (Tengström, 1848)
Chionodes whitmanella Clarke, 1942
Chionodes theurgis-complex
Chionodes gerdius Hodges, 1999
Chionodes theurgis Hodges, 1999
Chionodes tributor Hodges, 1999
Chionodes distinctella-complex
Chionodes apolectella (Walsingham, 1900)
Chionodes bastuliella (Rebel, 1931)
Chionodes canor Hodges, 1999
Chionodes continuella (Zeller, 1839)
Chionodes distinctella (Zeller, 1839)
Chionodes ensis Hodges, 1999
Chionodes ermolaevi Bidzilya, 2012
Chionodes fictor Hodges, 1999
Chionodes frigidella Huemer & Sattler, 1995
Chionodes hayreddini Koçak, 1986
Chionodes hinnella (Rebel, 1935)
Chionodes histon Hodges, 1999
Chionodes latro Hodges, 1999
Chionodes lictor Hodges, 1999
Chionodes metallicus (Braun, 1921)
Chionodes nigrobarbata (Braun, 1925)
Chionodes nubilella (Zetterstedt, 1839)
Chionodes offectus Hodges, 1999
Chionodes perpetuella (Herrich-Schäffer, 1854)
Chionodes praecia Hodges, 1999
Chionodes praetor Hodges, 1999
Chionodes sattleri Hodges, 1999
Chionodes sepultor Hodges, 1999
Chionodes viduella (Fabricius, 1794)
Chionodes braunella-complex
Chionodes braunella (Keifer, 1931)
Chionodes impes-complex
Chionodes impes Hodges, 1999
Chionodes fumatella-complex
Chionodes clarkei Hodges, 1999
Chionodes electella (Zeller, 1839)
Chionodes flavicorporella (Walsingham, 1882)
Chionodes fumatella (Douglas, 1850)
Chionodes ignorantella (Herrich-Schäffer, 1854)
Chionodes nebulosella (Heinemann, 1870)
Chionodes permacta (Braun, 1925)
Chionodes sagayica (Koçak, 1986)
Chionodes tantella Huemer & Sattler, 1995
unnamed species-group
Chionodes attonita (Meyrick, 1912)
Chionodes borzella Bidzilya, 2000
Chionodes caespitella (Zeller, 1877)
Chionodes cerussata (Walsingham, 1911)
Chionodes manabiensis Schmitz & Landry, 2007
Chionodes meridiochilensis King & Montesinos, 2012
Chionodes nephelophracta (Meyrick, 1932)
Chionodes perissosema (Meyrick, 1932)
Chionodes spirodoxa (Meyrick, 1931)
Chionodes stefaniae Schmitz & Landry, 2007
Chionodes tundra Bidzilya, 2012
Chionodes xylobathra (Meyrick, 1936)

Status unclear
Chionodes decolorella (Heinemann, 1870), described as Gelechia decolorella and recorded from Austria and Serbia
Chionodes decolorella ab. colorella (Caradja, 1920), described as Gelechia decolorella ab. colorella and recorded from the Alai Mountains

References

 , 1999: Fascicle 7.6 of The Moths of American North of Mexico (Gelechioidea: Gelechiidae). 
 , 1995: A taxonomic revision of Palaearctic Chionodes (Lepidoptera: Gelechiidae), Beiträge zur Entomologie 45 (1): 3-108.
 , 2012: Chionodes meridiochilensis sp. nov. from Chile: contribution to an understanding of its biology and description of its early stages (Insecta: Lepidoptera: Gelechiidae). Acta zoologica cracoviensia 55 (1): 45-58. Full article: .
 , 2007: Two new species of Chionodes Hübner from Ecuador, with a summary of known Galapagos records of Gelechiidae (Lepidoptera). Revue Suisse de Zoologie 114 (2): 175-184.

External links

Fauna Europaea
Nomina Insecta Nearctica
HOSTS

 
Gelechiini
Moth genera